The 2013 British Rowing Senior Championships were the 42nd edition of the National Senior Championships, held from 19–20 October 2013 at the National Water Sports Centre in Holme Pierrepont, Nottingham. They were organised and sanctioned by British Rowing, and are open to British rowers.

Medal summary

References

British Rowing Senior Championships
British Rowing Senior Championships
British Rowing Senior Championships